Gerd Bohner (born 1959) is a professor of social psychology at Bielefeld University.

Academia
Bohner studied psychology at Heidelberg University (1980-1986) and obtained his PhD in 1990. Since 2001, he has been head of the Social Psychology Unit at Bielefeld University's Department of Psychology. From 2007 to 2009 he served as Dean of the Faculty of Psychology and Sports Science. Currently he is a board member of the Institute for Interdisciplinary Research on Conflict and Violence (Institut für interdisziplinäre Konflikt- und Gewaltforschung). Before joining Bielefeld University, Bohner was senior lecturer and later professor at the University of Kent (1998–2001). His main research areas include attitudes, social judgement, social influence, marketing and advertising psychology, relations between groups, sexual violence, and sexual harassment. He was founding editor-in-chief of the academic journal Social Psychology (2007-2010) and editor of the Zeitschrift für Sozialpsychologie (2003-2006).

Selected publications 
with N. Dickel. 2011. Attitudes and attitude change. Annual Review of Psychology 62: 391-417. 
with A. Pina, G. T. Viki, and F. Siebler. 2010. Using social norms to reduce men's rape proclivity: Perceived rape myth acceptance of out-groups may be more influential than that of in-groups. Psychology, Crime and Law 16: 671-693. 
with F. Eyssel. 2010. Schema effects of rape myth acceptance on judgments of guilt and blame in rape cases: The role of perceived entitlement to judge. Journal of Interpersonal Violence 26.  (published online 25 May 2010).
with F. Eyssel, P. Süssenbach, and P. Schreiber. 2009. Neuentwicklung und Validierung eines szenariobasierten Verfahrens zur Erfassung der Neigung zu sexueller Aggression. [Development and validation of a scenario-based method to record the proclivity to become sexually aggressive] Diagnostica 55: 117–127.
with F. Eyssel, A. Pina, F. Siebler, and G. T. Viki. 2009. Rape myth acceptance: Affective, behavioural, and cognitive effects of beliefs that blame the victim and exonerate the perpetrator. In Rape: Challenging Contemporary Thinking, eds. M. A. H. Horvath and J. M. Brown. Cullompton, UK: Willan.
with F. Siebler and S. Sabelus. 2008. A refined computer harassment paradigm: Validation, and test of hypotheses about target characteristics. Psychology of Women Quarterly 32: 22–35.
with H. Gerger, H. Kley, and F. Siebler. 2007. The Acceptance of Modern Myths about Sexual Aggression (AMMSA) Scale: Development and validation in German and English. Aggressive Behavior 33: 422–440.
with H.-P. Erb, M. Hewstone, L. Werth, and M.-A. Reinhard, 2006. Large minorities and small majorities: Interactive effects of inferred and explicit consensus on attitudes. Basic and Applied Social Psychology 28: 221–231.
with F. Siebler and J. Schmelcher. 2006. Social norms and the likelihood of raping: Perceived rape myth acceptance of others affects men's rape proclivity. Personality and Social Psychology Bulletin 32: 286–297.
with C. I. Jarvis, F. Eyssel, and F. Siebler. 2005. The causal impact of rape myth acceptance on men's rape proclivity: Comparing sexually coercive and noncoercive men. European Journal of Social Psychology 35: 819–828.

External links 
 
 Member page in Social Psychology Network
 Interview with Bohner on rape myths in Frankfurter Rundschau
 Member Page at the German Psychological Society

1959 births
Academic staff of Bielefeld University
German social scientists
Living people
Heidelberg University alumni